Giuseppe Colantuono (born 26 November 1928) was an Italian weightlifter. He competed in the men's lightweight event at the 1948 Summer Olympics.

References

External links
 

1928 births
Possibly living people
Italian male weightlifters
Olympic weightlifters of Italy
Weightlifters at the 1948 Summer Olympics
People from Torre del Greco
Sportspeople from the Province of Naples
20th-century Italian people